The Cloëtta Prize is a Swiss distinction to honour personalities who have distinguished themselves in biomedical research.

Worth 50,000 Swiss francs, it has been awarded annually by the Max Cloëtta Foundation (based in Zurich), since 1974.

Laureates 
Source: Cloetta

See also

 List of biomedical science awards

References

External links 
 Official website

Biomedical awards
Swiss awards
Awards established in 1974